Alfred Lee may refer to:

Butch Lee (Alfred Lee, born 1956), Puerto Rican basketball player
Alfred Lee (bishop) (1807–1887), American Protestant Episcopal bishop
Alfred Lee (composer) (1839–1906), composer of many Victorian music hall songs, "The Daring Young Man on the Flying Trapeze" and "The Chipmunk Songbook"
Alfred McClung Lee (1903–1992), American sociologist, past president of American Sociological Association

See also